Summit Avenue station (announced as Winchester Street/Summit Avenue) is a light rail stop on the MBTA Green Line C branch, located in the median of Beacon Street between Winchester Street and Summit Avenue in the Coolidge Corner neighborhood of Brookline, Massachusetts. The stop has two low side platforms that serve the line's two tracks; it is not accessible.

History
Until around 2004, the station was listed as Winchester Street to avoid confusion with Summit Avenue stop on the B branch. The B branch stop was closed as part of a pilot program in April 2004 (after which the C branch stop became Summit Avenue) and permanently closed the following March.

Track work in 2018–19, which included replacement of platform edges at several stops, triggered requirements for accessibility modifications at those stops. By December 2022, design for Summit Avenue and seven other C Branch stations was 15% complete, with construction expected to take place in 2024.

References

External links

MBTA - Summit Avenue
Station from Google Maps Street View

Green Line (MBTA) stations
Railway stations in Brookline, Massachusetts